Gangnam Finance Center, formerly known as Star Tower or I-Tower, is a  skycraper in Seoul, South Korea.It was constructed in the period 1995–2001. It is the 33rd tallest building in South Korea and 9th or 10th tallest (sources vary) building in Seoul. It has 45 surface floors and 8 underground ones.

Tenants 
 Avaya   12F
 British American Tobacco Korea  42F-43F
 Chrysler Korea  14F
 Citibank Korea  12F
 Diageo  32F
 Double U Games  16F
 eBay Korea  34F-37F
 EMC  17F-18F
 Google  22F
 EUKOR Car Carriers  24F
 Heidrick & Struggles  5F
 Hanhwa Securities  12F
 IMM Investment Corp/PE 5F
 KEB  2F
 Newport Legacy Inc.  14F
 Nike Korea L.L.C    30F, 31F, 33F
 NH Investment&Securities   14F
 Partners Group  25F
 Ras Gas  15F
 Rolex Korea  4F
 Samjong KPMG  9F-11F
 KPMG Samjong Accounting Corp  27F
 Kookmin Bank PB  21F
 Korea Investment&Securities  15F
 Samsung Life Insurance  20F
 Samsung Securities  25F
 Seoul National Univ. Hospital  3F,38F-40F
 Shinhan Bank PB  20F
 Samsung F&M Insurance  4F
 Samsung Securities  25F
 Symantec Korea  28F
 11st sellerzone / SK Planet  4F
 TARGET  8F
 Tencent 6F
 The Executive Centre  41F
 The Walt Disney Company Korea 7F
 UL Korea 26F

References

External links

Buildings and structures in Gangnam District
Skyscraper office buildings in Seoul